Isuobiangwu, is a village in southeastern Nigeria. Also, it is located near the city of Owerri.

Villages in Igboland
Towns in Imo State